Felimare acriba is a species of colourful sea slug or dorid nudibranch, a marine gastropod mollusk in the family Chromodorididae.

Distribution
This nudibranch is known only from the Caribbean.

Description
Felimare acriba has a blue body which is covered in a yellow-gold mesh pattern with a series of black spots towards the edges of the mantle. The very edge of the mantle is yellow, with a thin red line inside this, then a more diffuse area of pink to white The rhinophores are purple-blue and the deeply indented mantle and gills are a gold-brown colour. The maximum recorded length is 60 mm.

Habitat 
Minimum recorded depth is 4 m. Maximum recorded depth is 26 m.

References

Chromodorididae
Gastropods described in 1967